The Basketbol Süper Ligi Finals MVP (English: Basketball Super League Finals MVP), is an annual basketball award that is presented to the most valuable player of the finals of the playoffs of the Türkiye Basketbol Süper Ligi (English: Turkish Basketball Super League), which is the top-tier level professional club basketball league in Turkey.

Award winners
Player nationalities by national team.

 There was no Finals MVP in the 2014 Turkish League Playoffs, because the last game of the Finals was boycotted by Galatasaray, over a dispute having to do with the referee assignments for game 7 of the series.
 There was no awarding in the 2019–20 season, because the season was cancelled due to the coronavirus pandemic in Turkey.

Multiple honors

Player nationality

Teams

See also
Basketbol Süper Ligi Mr. King

References

External links
 Turkish Basketball Federation official website 
 Turkish Basketball Super League official website 

Basketball most valuable player awards
 
European basketball awards